In mathematics, Boole's rule, named after George Boole, is a method of numerical integration.

Formula

Simple Boole's Rule
It approximates an integral:

 

 

It is expressed thus in Abramowitz and Stegun:

 

where the error term is

 

It is often known as Bode's rule, due to a typographical error that propagated from Abramowitz and Stegun.

The following constitutes a very simple implementation of the method in Common Lisp which ignores the error term:

(defun integrate-booles-rule (f x1 x5)
  "Calculates the Boole's rule numerical integral of the function F in
   the closed interval extending from inclusive X1 to inclusive X5
   without error term inclusion."
  (declare (type (function (real) real) f))
  (declare (type real                   x1 x5))
  (let ((h (/ (- x5 x1) 4)))
    (declare (type real h))
    (let* ((x2 (+ x1 h))
           (x3 (+ x2 h))
           (x4 (+ x3 h)))
      (declare (type real x2 x3 x4))
      (* (/ (* 2 h) 45)
         (+ (*  7 (funcall f x1))
            (* 32 (funcall f x2))
            (* 12 (funcall f x3))
            (* 32 (funcall f x4))
            (*  7 (funcall f x5)))))))

Composite Boole's Rule 
In cases where the integration is permitted to extend over equidistant sections of the interval , the composite Boole's rule might be applied. Given  divisions, the integrated value amounts to:

where the error term is similar to above. The following Common Lisp code implements the aforementioned formula:

(defun integrate-composite-booles-rule (f a b n)
  "Calculates the composite Boole's rule numerical integral of the
   function F in the closed interval extending from inclusive A to
   inclusive B across N subintervals."
  (declare (type (function (real) real) f))
  (declare (type real                   a b))
  (declare (type (integer 1 *)          n))
  (let ((h (/ (- b a) n)))
    (declare (type real h))
    (flet ((f[i] (i)
            (declare (type (integer 0 *) i))
            (let ((xi (+ a (* i h))))
              (declare (type real xi))
              (the real (funcall f xi)))))
      (* (/ (* 2 h) 45)
         (+ (*  7 (+ (f[i] 0) (f[i] n)))
            (* 32 (loop for i from 1 to (- n 1) by 2 sum (f[i] i)))
            (* 12 (loop for i from 2 to (- n 2) by 4 sum (f[i] i)))
            (* 14 (loop for i from 4 to (- n 4) by 4 sum (f[i] i))))))))

See also
 Newton–Cotes formulas
 Simpson's rule
 Romberg's method

Notes

References

 
 
 
 

Integral calculus
Numerical analysis
Numerical integration (quadrature)

Articles with example Lisp (programming language) code